Jiao, Lord of Wey (卫君角), also known as Wei Jiao (卫角), was a Qin dynasty feudal lord. He was the 44th and the last ruler of the state of Wey. After his death, He did not receive a posthumous name; Jiao was his given name.

Life 
Jiao was the heir of Lord Yuan of Wey. His relationship with Lord Yuan is not clear. According to the Records of the Grand Historian, he became the lord of Wey nine years before Qin's unification of China. If the records were correct, his year of accession was 230 BCE, but according to Japanese historian Takao Hirase, Jiao's year of accession was 241 BCE instead of 230 BCE. In the first year of his rule, he relocated the state of Wey and its people to Yewang.

After Qin's unification, Wey was the only remaining state out of all the Chinese states established according to the mandate of Zhou dynasty king excluding Qin. For reasons unknown, Qin Shihuang did not remove Jiao from his throne, but Emperor Qin Er Shi deposed Jiao and made him a commoner in 209 BCE. The state of Wey, established in 1040 BCE, was the longest-lasting state from the Zhou dynasty.

References 

Monarchs of Wey (state)
Qin dynasty people